Lily Agnes (1871–1899) is an English Thoroughbred racehorse. On the track she won 21 races including the Northumberland Plate, Doncaster Cup and Ebor Handicap. She is best known for being the dam of unbeaten Triple Crown winner Ormonde, but she also produced a number of other top foals. When she was in training she was described as "a light-fleshed, ragged hipped, lop-eared filly".

Race career
Lily Agnes was the daughter of 2000 Guineas and Epsom Derby winner Macaroni, out of Polly Agnes who had been given to James Snarry by Sir Tatton Sykes. As a two-year-old Lily Agnes won all of her six starts. As a three-year-old she won seven of her ten starts, her victories included the Northumberland Plate and Doncaster Cup. She won a further eight races, including the Ebor Handicap at York.

Stud career
Her owner James Snarry died in 1877. Lily Agnes went on to become one of the top broodmares producing a number of good racehorses and broodmares. After Lily Agnes visited Doncaster the Duke of Westminster decided to buy her, paying £2500.

Foals

c = colt, f = filly

Rossington sired Good and Plenty. Ormonde sired two time Eclipse Stakes winner Orme. Ornament was the dam of Champion Stakes winner Labrador and champion filly Sceptre who won four British Classic Races.

Lily Agnes died in June 1899 at the age of 28 at Eaton stud after becoming infirm in her old age.

The Lily Agnes Conditions Stakes at Chester Racecourse is a class 2 five furlong race named after her and is run during the May meeting.

Pedigree

Note: b. = Bay, br. = Brown, ch. = Chestnut

References

1871 racehorse births
1899 racehorse deaths
Racehorses bred in the United Kingdom
Racehorses trained in the United Kingdom
Thoroughbred family 16-g
Thoroughbred family 16-h